PT Krakatau Steel (Persero) Tbk (Krakatau Steel Company Limited) is the largest steel maker in Indonesia, headquartered in Cilegon, Banten. The factory is set on a  plot in the western end of Banten and adjacent to the Sunda Strait, and where the Krakatoa volcano and island from which the company takes its name are located.

It is a state-owned enterprise which is engaged in steel production. The company, which operates in Cilegon, Banten, was originally formed as a manifestation of the Trikora Steel Project, which was initiated by President Sukarno in 1960 to have a steel plant capable of supporting the development of an independent, high value-added national industry and influencing national economic development. When it was formed on May 20, 1962, the company, which was formerly called the Cilegon Steel Mill, was officially established in cooperation with a Soviet all-union foreign trade organization. However, the occurrence of severe political and economic turmoil, resulting in factory construction had stopped. It was only before entering the early 1970s, the factory unit resumed construction and officially operated on August 31, 1970 under the name Krakatau Steel. During the company's first decade of existence, Krakatau Steel has made rapid moves in the construction of an integrated steel production operation area in Cilegon with various inaugural operational inaugurations that were witnessed and inaugurated directly by President Soeharto from the integrated water treatment center, Cigading port, Cilegon 400 MW power plant and steel plant integrated covering 4 main steel products.

History 
Long before the idea of the national steel industry emerged, the forerunner to the processing of iron ore had been born since 1861. At that time, the colonial government of the Dutch East Indies built a furnace in Lampung. The Blast Furnace construction in Lampung functions to process the results of coal ore mining coal. Even though it is small in size, the processing industry is capable of producing crude steel that serves to make parts for sugar factories, rubber factories, and agricultural equipment. However, the iron ore processing industry is closed due to unprofessional management.

During the occupation of Japan, a furnace was built in South Kalimantan with coal fuel. However, the number of turbulent wars and physical revolution resulted in the pioneering of the steel industry had stopped. It was only in 1956 that the steel industry began to receive attention by reinforcing the idea of establishing a national steel industry. The Minister of Industry and Mining, Chaerul Saleh together with Djuanda from the State Design Bureau (now Bappenas), began to draw up a blueprint for the national steel industry. Indonesia, which is actively undertaking development, needs the presence of an iron ore processing industry. The State Design Bureau cooperated with foreign consultants to pioneer the steel industry called the "Trikora Steel Project".

After the feasibility study was completed, Cilegon was chosen as a place for processing and production of iron ore processed products because it has advantages such as large land that does not convert agricultural land, there are abundant water sources, affordable access from various islands to bring scrap metal through the port of Merak. The signing of development contract with a Soviet all-union foreign trade organization (the company claimed that the organization's name was "Tjazpromexport", or "All Union Export-Import Corporation") on June 7, 1960 continued with the laying of the first stone on May 20, 1962. Once again, the construction was halted again due to political turmoils resulted by the 30 September Movement. After a vacuum of five years, the Trikora Steel Project was continued through Government Regulation of the Republic of Indonesia Number 35, August 31, 1970 with the establishment of PT Krakatau Steel (Persero). The establishment of Krakatau Steel was validated by Tan Thong Kie Notary Deed Number 34, on October 23, 1971 in Jakarta.

Since then, Krakatau Steel has begun to catch up by accelerating the development of the integrated steel industry in Indonesia. The progress and hard work can be seen from a series of inauguration of factory units and supporting facilities. In 1977, the inauguration of President Suharto was inaugurated by a number of factories such as the Concrete Iron factory, the Profiling Iron factory and the Cigading Port. Two years later, officially the construction of the Sponge Iron factory, the Steel Billet plant, the Wire Rod factory, the 400 MW Steam Power Plant, the water treatment center and PT KHI Pipe were completed and fully operational. In 1983 the construction of the Steel Slab factory, the Hot Sheet Steel factory and the Sponge Iron factory were completed and officially operated. Until 1993, there was still the inauguration of expansion and modernization.

Production facilities 
Krakatau Steel has six production plants, making the company as the only integrated steel plant in the country. These plants produce many kinds of downstream products from upstream raw materials.

Production processes of steel products in Krakatau Steel starts from a direct reduction plant. This plant processes iron ore pellets into iron using natural gas and water.

The irons are then fed into electric arc furnaces in the slab steel plant and the billet steel plant. In these furnaces, the irons are mixed with scrap, hot bricket iron, and other additional materials to produce two kinds of steels, namely slab steels and billet steels.

Slab steels are then reheated and rolled in a hot strip mill, becoming hot rolled coils and plates. The outcomes of this mill are widely used for shipbuilding, pipes, buildings, general structures, and other applications. Furthermore, hot rolled coils could be processed, re-rolled, and chemically treated in a cold rolling nill becoming cold rolled coils and sheets. The results are generally used to manufacture car bodies, cans, cooking wares, and other applications.

Billet steels are rolled in a wire rod mill to fabricate wire rods which are commonly used for piano wires, bolts and nuts, steel cords, springs, and other applications.

Latest, PT Krakatau Nippon Steel Sumikin (KNSS) started operating its galvanized steel plant in Cilegon, Banten, in September 2017. KNSS, established in 2012, is a joint venture between NSSMC and state-owned steel maker PT Krakatau Steel to manufacture and market cold-rolled steel and hot-dipped galvanized steel products for Indonesia's automotive industry.

In addition to its subsidiaries, Krakatau Steel also has several joint ventures or affiliations, such as:

1. PT Kerismas Witikco Makmur2. PT Pelat Timah NusantaraTbk3. PT Krakatau Blue Water4. PT Krakatau DaeDong Machinery5. PT Krakatau Argo Logistics6. PT Krakatau Posco (Capacity: 3 million tons/year)7. PT Krakatau Posco Chemtech Calcination8. PT Indo Japan Steel Center (Capacity: 120,000 tons/year)9. PT Krakatau Poschem DongSuh Chemical10. PT Krakatau Semen Indonesia11. PT Krakatau Wajatama Osaka Steel Marketing12. PT Krakatau Osaka Steel (Capacity: 500,000 tons/year)13. PT Krakatau Nippon Steel Sumikin (Capacity: 500,000 tons/year)14. PT Wijaya Karya Krakatau Beton15. PT Krakatau Samator16. PT IndoJapan Steel Center

Business Development 
On November 10, 2010, in the midst of turbulent market conditions, PT Krakatau Steel (Persero) managed to become a publicly listed company by carrying out an initial public offering (IPO) and listing its shares on the Indonesian Stock Exchange. In 2011, PT Krakatau Steel (Persero) Tbk posted a net income of Rp17.9 trillion and net profit of Rp1.02 trillion. In 2011, the company and its subsidiaries with assets worth Rp21.5 trillion had 8,023 employees.

On November 26, 2014, Krakatau Steel inaugurated the second steel pipe factory owned by its subsidiary PT KHI Pipe Industry in Cilegon, Banten. With the operation of this new plant, PT KHI will become the largest steel pipe producer in Indonesia, the factory is focused on making steel pipes for the oil and gas industry.

Subholding Krakatau Sarana Infrastruktur 
Krakatau Sarana Infrastruktur, a subholding company which officially established on June 30, 2021. Krakatau Sarana Infrastruktur is a subsidiary of Krakatau Steel which consists of PT Krakatau Industrial Estate Cilegon (PT KIEC), PT Krakatau Tirta Industri (PT KTI), PT Krakatau Daya Listrik (PT KDL), and PT Krakatau Bandar Samudera (PT KBS).
Krakatau Sarana Infrastruktur is the first fully vertically integrated industrial service holding in Indonesia with four main business areas consisting of industrial estate, industrial water supply, energy needs, and ports.

References 

Manufacturing companies established in 1970
Steel companies of Indonesia
Government-owned companies of Indonesia
Companies based in Cilegon
Indonesian companies established in 1970
Companies listed on the Indonesia Stock Exchange
2010 initial public offerings